"Hylarana" persimilis, commonly known as the Sumatra frog, is a species of true frogs in the family Ranidae. It is native to Aceh, Sumatra, Indonesia. It is only known from the holotype collected from a lakeside.

References

persimilis
Amphibians of Indonesia
Endemic fauna of Indonesia
Amphibians described in 1923